Balunga Toka is a 2011 Indian Odia-language romantic comedy film directed by Sudhakara Basanta. The film stars Anubhav Mohanty and Barsha Priyadarshini as lead role. Balunga Toka was released on 2 October 2011.  The film was commercially successful and became the highest-grossing Odia film of all time. It is a remake of the 2004 Tamil-Telugu bilingual film 7G Rainbow Colony. The film score was released by Amara Muzik.

Synopsis
Chiku (Anubhav Mohanty) is living with his parents and younger sister . He always involves in fights on street and not interested in studies. Due to his rough behaviour, his father always scolds him. Chiku's life changes when he meets Preeti (Barsha Priyadarshini) and falls in love with her. He  got a job due to Preeti's efforts and Chiku's skill to convince people with very good way. When Preeti's mother got know the affair between chiku and preeti then she left the society and arranged the pre-planned marriage of her daughter with another guy. Preeti escapes from home to unite with Chiku. But due to some misunderstanding with Chiku, Preeti leaves Chiku and had an accident. And at the same place chiku also had an accident. Due to the accident, he losses his memory. After getting back his memory, he got to know that his father is getting beaten by some baddies. And at the same place Chiku saw Preeti is preparing for the marriage. At last and after the fight, Preeti's father feel the love and affection between Chiku and Preeti and he accepts their love.

Cast
 Anubhav Mohanty—Chiku
 Barsa Priyadarshini—Preeti
 Minaketan Das—Chiku's father
 Papu Pam Pam—Babli
 Priyanka Mahapatra—Chiku's mother
 Gurmeet Chaudhary - Odisha Hero Honda's MD who give job to Chiku
 Prativa Panda—Rocky
 Salil Mitra 
 Arabinda Sadhangi—Das Babu
 Jiban Panda 
 Manoj Panda
 Sambit Acharya
 Guddu Comedian
 kalicharan
 Sudhakar Basant

Soundtrack 
The songs are composed by Abhijit Mazumdar. The song "Balunga Toka" is based on "Hey Vetri Velaa" from Padikkadavan.

Box office
The film proved to be a big hit and  have crossed 100 days in several theaters in Odisha. It grossed a total of 4 crore at the box office.

Awards
 3rd Tarang Cine Awards 2012
 Best Film – Prabhas Raut
 Best Actor -Anubhav Mohanty
 Best Supporting Actor -Minaketan Das
 Best Comedian – Papu Pam Pam
 3rd Etv Oriya Film Awards 2012 
 Best Film  – Prabhas Raut
 Best Director – Sudhakara Basanta
 Best Actor – Anubhav Mohanty
 Best Comedian  – Papu Pam Pam
 Best Music director – Abhijit Majumdar
 Best Lyrics writer – Nirmal Nayak
 Lalchand Entertainment Awards 2012
 Best Actor – Anubhav Mohanty

References

External links
 

2011 films
Indian romantic comedy-drama films
Odia remakes of Tamil films
Odia remakes of Telugu films
2010s Odia-language films
2011 romantic comedy-drama films